Chionopsis, is a genus of saltwater clam, a marine bivalve mollusc in the family Veneridae, the venus clams.

Species
Species within this genus include: 
 Chionopsis amathusia (Philippi, 1844)
 Chionopsis crenata (Gmelin, 1791)
 Chionopsis crenifera (G. B. Sowerby I, 1835)
 Chionopsis gnidia (Broderip & G. B. Sowerby I, 1829)
 Chionopsis intapurpurea (Conrad, 1849)
 Chionopsis lilacina (Carpenter, 1864)
 Chionopsis ornatissima (Broderip, 1835)
 Chionopsis pinchoti (Pilsbry & Olsson, 1951)
 Chionopsis pulicaria (Broderip, 1835)

References

Veneridae
Bivalve genera